JEO may refer to:
 Jack Edward Oliver (1942–2007), British cartoonist
 Jovian Europa Orbiter, an ESA feasibility study
 Jupiter Europa Orbiter, a proposed NASA orbiter probe
 Justices examination order